Russian uses phonetic transcription for the Cyrillization of its many loanwords from French.  Some use is made of Cyrillic's iotation features to represent French's front rounded vowels and etymologically-softened consonants.

Consonants 
In the table below, the symbol  represents either a "softened" consonant or the approximant .

Doubled French consonants remain doubled in their Russian transcription: Rousseau – Руссо.  Silent consonants (common in French) are generally not transcribed, except where they exist in the surface form due to liaison.

Vowels 

Finally, the softened consonants modify the following vowels:

Neither  nor  are doubled.

Bibliography 
 Paul Garde, La Transcription des noms propres français en russe, Paris, Institut d'études slaves, 1974, 63 pages, 25 cm, collection « Documents pédagogiques de l'Institut d'études slaves » n° X, 

French
French language